U-231 may refer to:

 Uranium-231 (U-231 or 231U), an isotope of uranium
 German submarine U-231 of World War II
 U 231, one of the Gällsta Runestones in Sweden